HMS H41 was a British H class submarine built by Armstrong Whitworth, Newcastle Upon Tyne, England. She was laid down on 17 September 1917 and was commissioned in November 1918.

Sinking
The submarine, commanded by Lieutenant-Commander N.R. Peploe, was moored in a dock basin at Blyth, a few yards from the 6,620 ton depot ship . The ex-cruiser was in harbour for repairs to her main engines and during the afternoon she built up a head of steam and began to carry out a slow-speed trial. In the restricted waters of the dock basin the suction from the depot-ship's propellers drew the submarine towards her and, despite the efforts of both crews to keep the two vessels apart, Vulcans screws struck the stern of the submarine, cut through her outer casing and sliced open the pressure hull. H41 sank quickly as the sea rushed in and the crew were lucky to escape.

HMS H41 was raised and was then sold on 12 March 1920 in Sunderland.

References

 

 

British H-class submarines
Ships built on the River Tyne
1918 ships
World War I submarines of the United Kingdom
Shipwrecks in the North Sea
Shipwrecks of Northumberland
Royal Navy ship names
Maritime incidents in 1919
Submarines sunk in collisions
Ships built by Armstrong Whitworth